Divinka is a village and municipality in Žilina District in the Žilina Region of northern Slovakia.

History
The modern village of Divinka consists of two parts, which were originally two separate villages: Divinka (former Malá Divina) and Lalinok, which merged in 1911. During the Austro-Hungarian period, the village was a part of Trencsén County and belonged to the district of Kysucké Nové Mesto. The Veľký Vrch hill was fortified with ramparts of a vast hillfort, that rise up majestically above the village Divinka, which, thanks to its strategic location, has been inhabited since ancient times. This place, which gave many important testimonies of settlement in the times long before the first written mention of Divinka or Lalinok, is today a well-known cultural, historical and natural site. The castle occupies an area of approximately 12 hectares. Pieces of ceramics, iron, bronze and gold objects have been found there. The most famous discovery is the Celtic cointype "Divinka".

The first written mention of Lalinok dates back to April 4, 1325, in the document dealing with the property transfers of the noble Borčický family, Lalinok is referred to as Lylihng. The earliest direct written record of Divinka is preserved in the letter of the Nitra Cathedral chapter (Latin: Capitulum Ecclesiae Nitriensis), dated to March 19, 1393. The Chapter announced not only King Sigismund of Luxembourg but all the villages of the Lietava estate, including Divinka (referred to as Kysdywyne) and Lalinok (referred to as Lelenk), too, that the new lawful overlord of Lietava castle and the estate had become Dezider from Kapla.

Local residents have retained traditional folk costumes as well as dialect, but they are no longer worn. In the middle of the 19th century, divinity and tinker trade were the two most widespread crafts. A typical feature of this region was emigration. Local people traveled to the United States, Belgium, Denmark, and Germany to work there.

Geography
The municipality lies at an altitude of 327 metres and covers an area of 5.174 km². It has a population of about 1 024 people. Divinka is surrounded by a number of hills: Malý vrch, Veľký vrch, Prašivá, Všivák and Bok. Lalinok is surrounded by Homola and Hradisko. The highest point in the land area is the peak of Prašivá, with an altitude of 626 m above sea level.

Religion

Roman Catholic Church 
The village has a strong Roman Catholic tradition. From the point of view of church autonomy, Divinka and Lalinok have never formed a separate parish. They have always been in the administration of other parishes since their creation. The municipalities alternately belonged to the Parish district Dolný Hričov or Kysucké Nové Mesto. After the establishment of a separate parish in the nearby village called Divina (former Veľká Divina) in 1771, Divinka and Lalinok joined it. Today, the village belongs to the administration of the Diocese of Žilina.

Judaism 
An integral part of the history and demography of Divinka and Lalinok was also the Jewish ethnicity. The Jews moved to Divinka and Lalinok sometime in the first half of the 19th century and devoted themselves to timber trade and tavern services. The Jews left voluntarily later in 1918, after selling out their possessions to local residents.

Monuments

Divinka 

 Former Ancient fortress Veľký vrch – Archaeological site registered in the Central List of the Slovak Memorial Fund.
Renaissance Suňogs´ mansion from the 16th century. Mansion is registered in the Central List of the Slovak Memorial Fund.
 Chapel of St. John of Nepomuk from 1742, which was built by Agnes Suňog. Chapel is registered in the Central List of the Slovak Memorial Fund.
 St. Anna's Chapel at the local cemetery, which was built in the middle of the 18th century by Steven Višňovský.
Observation tower in Malý vrch.

Lalinok 

 Walled cross from 1907 with the Art Nouveau elements.
 Small chapel dedicated to the Virgin Mary, coming from the late 19th century.
 Bell tower with the bell from 1819.
 Memorial dedicated to WWI victims from Lalinok village. The memorial is located at the local cemetery.

In Lalinok, old wooden folk houses from the 19th century have been preserved. A single track railway, which does not exist anymore, was the curiosity of Lalinok. It was used to transport material from the stone quarry in Divinka to construct the county road from Budatín to Kotešová. In the past, there were two mills in Divinka, one of which is now used as the Municipal office building.

Genealogical resources

The records for genealogical research are available at the state archive "Štátny archív v Žiline so sídlom v Bytči".

 Roman Catholic church records (births/marriages/deaths): 1690 – 1898 (parish B)

Sport 
Ski jumping is the most popular among sporting activities, locally. The origin of the skiing sport in Lalinok can be dated to 1940. Legendary were also the biking races that arose in 1991 and had a long tradition in the village. Like everywhere in the surrounding villages, Divinka and Lalinok have their own football history. At first football was played on natural playing fields with handball balls while the cattle grazed. Since 1939, Easter football tournaments have been played in nearby Svederník. Today there is a large football field in Divinka.

Significant natives 

 Vojtech Križan Sr. (* May 1, 1908 Rajec – † April 30, 1975 Divinka) was a prominent beekeeper – expert, the author of professional literature, and an innovator. After Vojtech Križan became the caretaker and later headmaster of the elementary school in the village in 1940, bee-keeping increased in popularity, with Divinka becoming the destination for visitors and beekeeping specialists from all over Slovakia. Beekeeping also has a long tradition in the village, with the first records of beekeepers going back to the early 20th century. He and his wife Valéria worked as teachers at the local school for a long time. 
 Martin Medňanský (* November 10, 1840 – † November 3, 1899). Medňanský was a member of the noble family and he was a Catholic priest, poet, translator, and journalist.

See also
 List of municipalities and towns in Slovakia

References

External links
https://web.archive.org/web/20071116010355/http://www.statistics.sk/mosmis/eng/run.html
Surnames of living people in Divinka

Villages and municipalities in Žilina District